Didor International Film Festival is a bi-annual film festival in Dushanbe, Tajikistan. Originally conceived as a Persian movie festival, it has now expanded its scope to take in Russian and European movies. A documentary festival takes place in the uneven years.

2006 Festival
Golden Didor: "Poet of the Wastes" directed by Mohammad Ahmadi (Iran)

2004 Festival
Golden Statue: "Village Council" directed by Ernest Abduzgaparov (Kyrgyzstan)
Silver Statue for the best direction to "Wild River, Calm Sea" by Marat Sarulu (Kazakhstan)
Silver Statue for the best actress to Taraneh Alidousti (Iran)

Grants
In 2004, The House of Cinema of Makhmalbaf (Iran) and the DIDOR International Film Festival allocated grants in the amount of USD 2,000 for the creation of the short-feature film by young and gifted filmmakers Mirzob Nugmanov, Aloviddin Abdullaev, Denis Mechetov, Shahryar Nazari, and another $2,000 grant to Bakhtiyor Kakhorov for the creation of a cartoon.

References

See also 
 Central Asian and Southern Caucasus Film Festivals Confederation

Film festivals in Tajikistan